Jillian Margaret Saulbrey (born 22 February 1943) is a New Zealand former cricketer who played as an all-rounder, bowling left-arm fast-medium and batting right-handed. She appeared in eleven Test matches and five One Day Internationals for New Zealand between 1966 and 1975, and she was part of the New Zealand side that finished third in the 1973 Women's Cricket World Cup. She played domestic cricket for Otago and Wellington.

In 1976, in a Hallyburton Johnstone Shield match for Wellington against Auckland, Saulbrey took 9/22 in 16 overs in the second innings to bowl Auckland out for 51.

References

External links
 
 

1943 births
Living people
Cricketers from Lower Hutt
New Zealand women cricketers
New Zealand women Test cricketers
New Zealand women One Day International cricketers
Otago Sparks cricketers
Wellington Blaze cricketers